Knut Sydsæter (5 October 1937 – 29 September 2012) was a  Norwegian mathematician.

He is known for having written several books in mathematics for economic analysis, mainly in Norwegian and English.
However, his books have been released in several other languages such as Swedish, German, Italian, Chinese, Japanese, Portuguese, Spanish, Russian and Hungarian among others.

References

External links
Knut Sydsæter's Home Page (archived at web.archive.org)

Norwegian economists
Norwegian mathematicians
Academic staff of the University of Oslo
1937 births
2012 deaths